The Middle European Class (SEC/SEK), sometimes translated as Average European Class, is a political party in Bulgaria established by nightclub owner Georgi Manev. It is currently led by Konstantin Bachiiski and is part of the electoral coalition We Continue the Change.

Electoral participation

Parliamentary elections

2017 
In the 2017 parliamentary election, the party was part of the ultra nationalists electoral alliance United Patriots with IMRO – Bulgarian National Movement, National Front for the Salvation of Bulgaria and Attack. SEC failed to secure any seats, but United Patriots entered a coalition with GERB to form the Third Borisov Government. In July 2020 SEC withdrew from United Patriots.

April 2021 
SEC entered a new coalition with far-right political party IMRO but on 17 February 2021 the Central Election Commission did not approve "Middle European Class" for participation in the April 2021 parliamentary election. The reason given was "unsealed documents, lack of signature of the party representative and other documentary failures."

July 2021 
On 6 June 2021 SEC was again not approved for participation in the July 2021 parliamentary election but party members became part of Petar Moskov's "National Union of the Right" electoral coalition.

November 2021 
On 17 September 2021 Georgi Manev stepped down as leader of the party and retired from politics. Konstantin Bachiiski became party leader and on 19 September 2021 the party and Volt Bulgaria announced the electoral coalition We Continue the Change led by Kiril Petkov and Asen Vasilev, former caretaker ministers. In the November 2021 Bulgarian parliamentary еlection We Continue the Change came in first place with 67 seats. It formed a broad coalition between BSP, ITN and DB and was given the mandate to form a government on 13 December 2021. SEK has 4 seats in the National Assembly.

References

External links 

 (bg) 

Political parties in Bulgaria